is the second series in the Ojamajo Doremi series. It was directed by Takuya Igarashi and produced by Toei Animation. It was broadcast on TV Asahi from February 6, 2000, to January 28, 2001, and lasted 49 episodes. In this series, Doremi and the girls witness the birth of a mysterious baby, Hana, in the Witch World and are given the task to take care of her for a year according to the laws.

Throughout the run of this series, a 30-minute theatrical film directed by Shigeyasu Yamauchi, titled . was released along with Supreme Evolution!! The Golden Digimentals/Digimon Hurricane Touchdown!! for the 2000 Summer Toei Anime Fair. The Digimon movie was split into two parts and Ojamajo Doremi Sharp Movie was screened in between.

Despite this series never being dubbed in English, Toei Animation's English website uses "Magical Doremi" instead of "Ojamajo Doremi".

Episode list

References

2000 Japanese television series debuts
2001 Japanese television series endings
Ojamajo Doremi series
Ojamajo Doremi episode lists